"Hot Line to Heaven" is a song co-written and performed by English girl group Bananarama.  The song appears on their second, self-titled album and was released as a single in the UK in 1984.

In its album version, "Hot Line to Heaven" is a seven-plus-minutes mid-tempo pop song.  It was edited to about three-and-a-half minutes for its single release.  After Bananarama recorded the soundtrack song "The Wild Life" (from the film of the same name), the edited version of "Hot Line to Heaven" was pressed onto the Bananarama album in order to make room for the late-addition of "The Wild Life".  This was only a temporary pressing, however, as Bananarama'''s track listing was restored several months later, with the full version of "Hot Line to Heaven" intact.

The single did not perform well on the charts and got very limited release outside of UK.  As was the case with the Bananarama album, the dark lyrical content did not meet with mainstream acceptance and became the group's lowest charting UK single since their debut "Aie a Mwana", however it was the fourth release from the album.

Music video
The music video features the girls trying to persuade a record executive to be interested in their demo tapes. They annoy him by playing their tape and dancing around his office until the executive loses his cool and throws them out. When the girls show up as angels in his hallucinations, he finally relents.

Versions

 UK 7" vinyl singleLondon Records NANA 8"Hot Line to Heaven (single version)"  3:40
"State I'm In"  2:48

 UK 12" vinyl singleLondon Records NANX 8"Hot Line to Heaven" (extended version) 7:19
"State I'm In" (extended version) 4:48

+ an "edited version" 3:48 of "Hot Line to Heaven (album version)" was released on the compilation album "Bananarama - Bunch of Hits". This was also the version released on the 2007 re-issue of the "Bananarama" album incorrectly titled as the "7-inch mix"

Some versions of the 7-inch came shrinkwrapped with a jigsaw of the front cover NANAJ 8''

Charts

References

1984 singles
London Records singles
Bananarama songs
Songs written by Sara Dallin
Songs written by Siobhan Fahey
Songs written by Keren Woodward
Songs written by Tony Swain (musician)
Songs written by Steve Jolley (songwriter)
Song recordings produced by Jolley & Swain
1983 songs